The 1985 Washington Huskies football team was an American football team that represented the University of Washington during the 1985 NCAA Division I-A football season.  In its eleventh season under head coach Don James, the team compiled a 7–5 record, and outscored its opponents 238 to 225. Joe Kelly was selected for the Guy Flaherty Most Inspirational award. Kelly was also selected as the team's most valuable player.  Kelly, Vestee Jackson, Hugh Millen, and Dennis Soldat were the team captains.

Senior quarterback Millen started the first nine games, and sophomore Chris Chandler the final three.

Schedule

Roster

Game summaries

UCLA

Oregon State

Washington State

NFL Draft
Four Huskies were selected in the 1986 NFL Draft.

References

Washington
Washington Huskies football seasons
Freedom Bowl champion seasons

Washington Huskies football